The 1902–03 British Home Championship was an international football tournament between the British Home Nations.

Unusually, the trophy was shared by three of the Home Nations all of whom scored four points. At the time, goal difference was not used to differentiate teams. In addition to the usual favourites of England and Scotland, Ireland also took their first ever share of the championship, after scoring their first ever victory over the Scots with a 2–0 win in Glasgow and subsequently beating Wales. The tournament was played under the shadow of the previous year's finale, when a wooden stand at Ibrox Stadium had given way under the mass of supporters and 26 people had fallen to their deaths.

Ireland and England began the competition, with the English scoring four without reply to take an early lead. England extended their advantage in the second match with a 2–1 victory over Wales and seemed to be on course for the championship. Scotland began their challenge against Wales in a match they narrowly won before stumbling against Ireland in a match the Irish dominated in front of the Scottish home support. Just two years previously at the same stadium, Scotland had beaten Ireland 11–0 in what is still their record win. On the back of this result, Ireland beat Wales 2–0 ending a miserable tournament for the Welsh who had scored only one goal and failed to gain a single point. In the final match between England and Scotland, Scotland needed a win to draw level with Ireland and England whilst England needed only a draw to take the championship outright. In a tough match in Sheffield both sides played well, but Scotland eventually won 2–1 taking their share of the title.

Table

Results

Winning squads

References

1903 in British sport
Brit
Brit
1902
Ireland national football team (1882–1950)
Brit
Brit